Justin Avendano (born 11 August 1993) is an Australian cricketer who has represented the Sydney Sixers and the Melbourne Stars in the Big Bash League.

Avendano plays club cricket for North Sydney and for the Cricket NSW High Performance Transition Academy squad. In 2012 featured on the FOX Sports reality show Cricket Superstar.   Avendano is a big hitting batsman  and in a Sydney Sixers Academy match in November 2018 against Auckland at the Hurtsville Oval, his innings of 122 from 63 balls included hitting the maximum 6 sixes in one single 6-ball over.  Avendano also hit a century opening the batting in a development game for the Sixers Academy against the Lahore Qalanders at the Blacktown International Sports Park in October 2017.

He made his Twenty20 debut for Sydney Sixers in the 2018–19 Big Bash League season on 1 January 2019.

In January 2022, Avendano was called up into the Melbourne Stars squad for the 2021–22 Big Bash after several members of the original squad became unavailable due to illness.

References

Living people
1993 births
Place of birth missing (living people)
Australian cricketers
Participants in Australian reality television series
Sydney Sixers cricketers
Melbourne Stars cricketers